The FAW Premier Cup (formerly the FAW Invitation Cup) is a defunct Welsh football cup competition, organised annually by the Football Association of Wales from 1997 to 2008.

Results

winners